Henry Grigsley Poague (May 24, 1889 – November 14, 1953) was an American football coach.  He was the 11th head football coach at the Virginia Military Institute (VMI) in Lexington, Virginia, serving for the 1913 season, and compiling a record of 7–1–2.

Head coaching record

References

External links
 

1889 births
1953 deaths
VMI Keydets football coaches
VMI Keydets football players
People from Lexington, Virginia